Zarjabad (also Romanized as Zarjābād and Zarajābād; also known as Zaianjua, Zarandzhua, and Zeyānjūyeh) is a village in Zarjabad Rural District of Firuz District, Kowsar County, Ardabil province, Iran. At the 2006 census, its population was 1,127 in 252 households. The following census in 2011 counted 936 people in 261 households. The latest census in 2016 showed a population of 778 people in 231 households; it was the largest village in its rural district.

References 

Kowsar County

Towns and villages in Kowsar County

Populated places in Ardabil Province

Populated places in Kowsar County